Lingo Landing, Delaware is a locality on the southwest shore of Rehoboth Bay located six miles south of Rehoboth Beach in Sussex County, Delaware.

References

Landforms of Sussex County, Delaware